Luis Salvador may refer to:
Luis Salvador Carmona (1708–1767), Spanish sculptor
Luis Miguel Salvador (born 1968), Mexican footballer
Luis Salvador (politician) (born 1963), Spanish politician
Lou Salvador (1905–1973), Filipino basketball player

See also
Luis Salvadores Salvi (1932–2014), Chilean basketball player